was a Japanese civil servant who served as the President of the Asian Development Bank from January 16, 1999 to February 1, 2005.

On July 17, 2008, Chino, 74, died in Tokyo, Japan, due to liver failure. He is survived by his wife and two daughters.

References

External links
 ADB News release re: Tadao Chino announces resignation

Japanese bankers
1934 births
2008 deaths
People from Fujieda, Shizuoka